The 2014–15 Tunisian Ligue Professionnelle 3 (Tunisian Professional League) season began on 7 November 2014. 
42 teams compete in 3 groups of 14 teams each. The winner of each group is promoted to Tunisian Ligue Professionnelle 2, while the four last teams of each group are relegated to the Tunisian Ligue 4.

Teams

North Group
 STIR Sportive Zarzouna
 Stade Africain Menzel Bourguiba
 ES Radès
 JS Soukra
 JS El Omrane
 AS Mhamdia
 VS Menzel Abderrahmane 	
 US Bousalem
 Dahmani AC
 CO Transports
 Club Sportif des Cheminots
 Éclair Testourien
 Mouldia Manouba
 Association Mégrine Sport

Center Group
 CS Hilalien
 AS Soliman
 ES Fahs
 CS Makthar
 AS Menzel Nour
 US Siliana
 CS Menzel Bouzelfa
 AS Teboulba
 ES Beni-Khalled
 HS Kalâa Kebira
 ES Djemmal
 ES Haffouz
 RS Sbiba
 Ahly Bouhjar

South Group
 Espoir Sportif de Jerba Midoun
 Club olympique de Médenine
 ES Bouchemma
 US Tataouine
 ES Rogba Tataouine
 SS Gafsa
 ES Feriana
 PS Sakiet Daier
 CS Redeyef
 CO Ghannouch
 US Ksour Essef
 Sporting Club Moknine
 Océano Club de Kerkennah
 FS Ksar Gafsa

Standings

North group table

Center group table

South group table

See also
2014–15 Tunisian Ligue Professionnelle 1
2014–15 Tunisian Ligue Professionnelle 2
2014–15 Tunisian Cup

References

External links
 Results on the "Fédération Tunisienne de Football" website
 Ligue 3

Tunisian Ligue Professionnelle 3
3
Tunisa